Bashan Station is a station on Line 5 of Chongqing Rail Transit in Chongqing municipality, China. It is located in Jiulongpo District and opened in 2021.

Station structure
There are two island platforms at this station, but only two inner ones are currently in use, while the other two outer ones are reserved.

References

Railway stations in Chongqing
Railway stations in China opened in 2021
Chongqing Rail Transit stations